Ante Županović (born 27 September 1949) is a Croatian physician and politician who served as Mayor of Šibenik from 2009 to 2013.

References 
 

1949 births
Living people
Croatian politicians
Mayors of places in Croatia